Africa Sports d'Abidjan is a multi-sports club based in Abidjan, Ivory Coast.

History
The club was founded in 1947 by Sery Mogador.

Sports
The club fields teams in the sports of track and field, handball, basketball, and association football. Of these, the football team is the most prominent. They play at the Stade Champroux. The club is currently playing in the Ligue 2.

Association football
Africa Sports are the joint-most successful Association football club in the Côte d'Ivoire, together with ASEC Mimosas.

On 6 December 1992, they became the first club in the Ivory Coast to win the African Cup Winners Cup, after beating Vital'O FC.

Logos

Performance in CAF competitions
CAF Champions League: 9 appearances

1997 – Second round
2000 – Group stage/Semi-finals
2004 – Group stage

2005 – Second round
2006 – Preliminary round
2008 – First round

2009 – First round
2010 – First round
2012 – First round

 African Cup of Champions Clubs: 12 appearances

1968 – disqualified in First round
1969 – First round
1972 – Second round
1978 – Second round

1979 – Second round
1983 – First round
1984 – First round
1986 – Finalist

1987 – Quarter-finals
1988 – Quarter-finals
1989 – First round
1990 – Second round

CAF Confederation Cup: 1 appearance
2011 – withdrew in First round

CAF Cup: 2 appearances
1995 – First round
2001 – Semi-finals

CAF Cup Winners' Cup: 7 appearances

1980 – Finalist
1982 – Quarter-finals
1992 – Champion

1993 – Finalist
1998 – Semi-finals
1999 – Champion

2003 – Quarter-Finals

Squad

Honours
 Côte d'Ivoire Premier Division: 18
1956, 1967, 1968, 1971, 1977, 1978, 1982, 1983, 1985, 1986, 1987, 1988, 1989, 1996, 1999, 2007, 2008, 2011.

 Côte d'Ivoire Cup: 17
1961, 1962, 1964, 1977, 1978, 1979, 1981, 1982, 1985, 1986, 1989, 1993, 1998, 2002, 2009, 2015, 2017.

 Coupe Houphouët-Boigny: 11
1979 ,1981, 1982, 1986, 1987, 1988, 1989, 1991, 1993, 2003, 2015.

 African Cup Winners' Cup: 2
1992, 1999.

 CAF Super Cup: 1
1992.

West African Club Championship (UFOA Cup): 3
1985, 1986, 1991.

French West African Cup: 1
1958.

References

External links

 
Football clubs in Ivory Coast
Football clubs in Abidjan
Association football clubs established in 1947
Sports clubs established in 1947
1947 establishments in Ivory Coast
African Cup Winners Cup winning clubs
CAF Super Cup winning clubs